Middlesmoor is a small hill village at the head of Nidderdale in the Harrogate district of North Yorkshire, England.  Middlesmoor is the principal settlement in the civil parish of Stonebeck Up, historically a township in the ancient parish of Kirkby Malzeard in the West Riding of Yorkshire.

History 
The place name was first mentioned in the 12th century.  It probably means "moorland in the middle of two streams" referring to the River Nidd and its tributary How Stean Beck.  An alternative explanation is that the name comes from an otherwise unrecorded personal name, Midele, also seen in the name of Middlesbrough.

In the 12th century Byland Abbey established a grange at Middlesmoor.

Church 
It appears that there has been a place of worship at Middlesmoor since Anglo-Saxon times. There is a stone cross inscribed "Cross of St Ceadda" (Chad), dated to Anglo-Saxon times, in the Church of St Chad, which also contains an ancient font which is possibly Anglo-Saxon.

The present church was built in 1864 by William Henry Crossland. It is a Grade II listed building. The church occupies a commanding position overlooking upper Nidderdale.

References

External links 

Nidderdale
Villages in North Yorkshire